J. Alexander Baumann (10 December 1942 – 2 February 2022) was a Swiss politician. A member of the Swiss People's Party, he served in the National Council from 1995 to 2011.

Biography
Baumann was born in Zürich in 1942. He grew up in Flüelen in the Canton of Uri. He was a lawyer by profession and served as a lieutenant-colonel in the Swiss Armed Forces.

He then represented Thurgau in the National Council from 1995 to 2011.

Baumann died from a heart attack in Davos, on 2 February 2022, at the age of 79.

References

1942 births
2022 deaths
20th-century Swiss politicians
21st-century Swiss politicians
Members of the National Council (Switzerland)
Artists from Zürich
Swiss People's Party politicians